Events in the year 2011 in Georgia.

Incumbents
President: Mikheil Saakashvili
Prime Minister: Nikoloz Gilauri
Chairperson: Davit Bakradze

Events

 4 April - Georgian Airways Flight 834, chartered by the United Nations, crashes in the Democratic Republic of the Congo while trying to land in N'djili Airport in Kinshasa.
 21 May - Anti-government protests against President Saakashvili begin in Tbilisi
 13 November - 2011 South Ossetian referendum
 13 November - 2011 South Ossetian presidential election

Arts and entertainment
In music: Georgia in the Eurovision Song Contest 2011.

Sports
Football (soccer) competitions: Umaglesi Liga, Georgian Cup.

Births
 27 September - Giorgi Bagration Bagrationi, son of Prince David Bagration of Mukhrani and Princess Anna Bagrationi Gruzinsky

Deaths
January 10 — Shota Kviraia, ex-Minister of Interior (1993–1995) and of Security (1995–1997), kidney failure, Moscow.
 July 19 — Vakhtang Gogolashvili, writer (born 1932).

References

 
Georgia
Georgia
Years of the 21st century in Georgia (country)
2010s in Georgia (country)
Georgia